The Bride of Fear is a 1918 American silent drama film directed by Sidney Franklin and starring Jewel Carmen, Charles Gorman, and Lee Shumway. Its plot follows a distraught, suicidal woman who is wooed by a violent criminal.

Cast
Jewel Carmen as Ann Carter
Charles Gorman as Hayden Masters
Lee Shumway as Donald Sterling
Charles Bennett as Martin Sterling

Reception
The Los Angeles Times praised the film as a "clean-cut, sane, well-acted and engaging little story." The Tuscaloosa News also praised the film for its "striking" opening scene, ultimately deeming the film a "gripping tale with a smashing finish."

References

External links

1918 films
American crime films
American silent films
Films directed by Sidney Franklin
American black-and-white films
1910s American films
1910s English-language films